Jam roly-poly, shirt-sleeve pudding, dead man's arm or dead man's leg is a traditional British pudding probably first created in the early 19th century. It is a flat-rolled suet pudding, which is then spread with jam and rolled up, similar to a Swiss roll, then steamed or baked and is traditionally served with custard. In days past, jam roly-poly was also known as shirt-sleeve pudding, because it was often steamed and served in an old shirt-sleeve, leading to the nicknames of dead-man's arm and dead man's leg. In the past it was known as roly poly pudding.

Description
Jam roly-poly features in Mrs Beeton's cookery book, as roly-poly jam pudding. It is one of a range of puddings that are now considered part of the classic desserts of the mid 20th century British school dinners. Jam roly-poly is considered a modern British classic, alongside sticky toffee pudding and spotted dick. In Beatrix Potter's 1908 book The Tale of Samuel Whiskers or, The Roly-Poly Pudding, the character Tom Kitten is rolled into a pudding by the invading rats.

See also

 List of steamed foods
 Comfort food

References

External links

British puddings
English cuisine
Steamed foods
Foods with jam